James Jay Joseph (born April 13, 1959) is an American clinical psychologist and author. He practices psychology in the San Francisco Bay Area. He is known for his criticisms of behavior genetics and twin studies in psychology and psychiatry. His view, as he articulated in his 2003 book The Gene Illusion, is that such research is so flawed as to render all of its results completely meaningless.

Biography
Joseph received his undergraduate education from the University of California, Berkeley. He went on to receive his master's degree from the New College of California in 1994 and his Psy.D from the California School of Professional Psychology in 2000. He received his license to practice psychology in California in 2003. In 2014 he published The Trouble with Twin Studies, which argued that research based on twin studies was highly flawed and could not be used to prove heritability of traits, as they fail to adequately control for environmental factors, as well as accusations of ethics violations in research practices. The book was negatively reviewed by psychologist Eric Turkheimer, who argued twin study research was valid.

Books
The Gene Illusion (Algora, 2004)
The Missing Gene (Algora, 2006)
The Trouble with Twin Studies (Routledge, 2015)
Schizophrenia and Genetics (BookBaby, 2017)

References

Further reading

External links

1959 births
Living people
American clinical psychologists
University of California, Berkeley alumni
New College of California alumni
California School of Professional Psychology alumni
21st-century American male writers
American psychology writers
21st-century American non-fiction writers
American male non-fiction writers